Blues – The Common Ground is an album by guitarist Kenny Burrell recorded in 1967 and 1968 and released on the Verve label.

Reception

Allmusic awarded the album 3 stars with its review stating "Blues - The Common Ground finds Burrell backed by lots of brass and wind instruments for most of the album, hardly his usual setting. But his guitar successfully weaves in and out of songs... blending with the band and creating a pleasant balance".

Track listing 
 "Everydays" (Stephen Stills) - 3:15   
 "Every Day (I Have the Blues)" (Peter Chatman) - 3:14   
 "The Preacher" (Horace Silver) - 2:54   
 "Angel Eyes" (Earl Brent, Matt Dennis) - 4:59   
 "The Common Ground" (Kenny Burrell, Warren Stephens) - 2:52   
 "Were You There" (Traditional) - 1:07   
 "Burning Spear" (Richard Evans) - 2:45   
 "Wonder Why" (Sammy Cahn, Nikolaus Brodszky) - 3:55   
 "Soulful Brothers" (Burrell, Stephens) - 5:31   
 "See See Rider" (Gertrude Rainey) - 3:25   
 "Sausalito Nights" (Burrell, Stephens) - 4:12

Personnel 
Kenny Burrell - guitar
Thad Jones (tracks 3-5 & 7), Jimmy Nottingham (tracks 3-5 & 7), Ernie Royal (tracks 3-5 & 7), Bernie Glow (tracks 1, 2 8 & 10), Jimmy Owens (tracks 1, 2, 8 & 10), Snooky Young (tracks 1, 2, 8 & 10) - trumpet
Wayne Andre (tracks 1–5, 7, 8 & 10), Jimmy Cleveland (tracks 1–5, 7, 8 & 10), Urbie Green (tracks 3-5 & 7), Tony Studd (tracks 3-5 & 7), Paul Faulise (tracks 1, 2, 8 & 10), Bill Watrous (tracks 1, 2, 8 & 10) - trombone
Harvey Phillips (tracks 3-5 & 7), Don Butterfield (tracks 1, 2, 8 & 10) - tuba
Jerome Richardson - reeds (tracks 1–5, 7, 8 & 10)
Herbie Hancock - piano
Ron Carter - bass
Grady Tate (tracks 3–7, 9 & 11), Donald McDonald (tracks 1, 2, 8 & 10) - drums
Johnny Pacheco - percussion (tracks 1–5, 7, 8 & 10)
Don Sebesky - arranger (tracks 1–5, 7, 8 & 10)

References 

Kenny Burrell albums
1968 albums
Verve Records albums
Albums produced by Esmond Edwards
Albums arranged by Don Sebesky